Små, små ord is a song written by Peter Grundström, dealing with taking care of each other in a world where some people live in affluence, others just for today.

The song was recorded by Berth Idoffs, on the 1988 album Dansglädje 88, scoring a Svensktoppen hit with the song for 10 weeks between 11 December 1988-26 February 1989, peaking at third position.

Vikingarna recorded the song on 1998 album "Kramgoa låtar 16". Burkhardt Brozat wrote lyrics in German, as Wach' ich oder träum' ich, recorded by Vikingarna on the band's German-language album Kuschel dich in meine Arme during their German-language promotion, with the band known as "Vikinger".

At Dansbandskampen 2008 the song was performed by Mickeys.

Anne-Lie Rydé recorded the song on her 2010 album .

The song has also been used in a commercial film.

References 

1988 songs
Swedish songs
Swedish-language songs
Vikingarna (band) songs
Berth Idoffs songs
Anne-Lie Rydé songs